The LGP-30, standing for Librascope General Purpose and then Librascope General Precision, was an early off-the-shelf computer. It was manufactured by the Librascope company of Glendale, California (a division of General Precision Inc.), and sold and serviced by the Royal Precision Electronic Computer Company, a joint venture with the Royal McBee division of the Royal Typewriter Company. The LGP-30 was first manufactured in 1956, at a retail price of $47,000, .

The LGP-30 was commonly referred to as a desk computer.

Design 

The primary design consultant for the Librascope computer was Stan Frankel, a Manhattan Project veteran and one of the first programmers of ENIAC.  He designed a usable computer with a minimal amount of hardware.  The single address instruction set had only 16 commands. Magnetic drum memory held the main memory, and the central processing unit (CPU) processor registers, timing information, and the master bit clock, each on a dedicated track.  The number of vacuum tubes was minimized by using solid-state diode logic, a bit-serial architecture and multiple use of each of the 15 flip-flops.

It was a binary, 31-bit word computer with a 4096-word drum memory. Standard inputs were the Flexowriter keyboard and paper tape (ten six-bit characters/second).  The standard output was the Flexowriter printer (typewriter, working at 10 characters/second).  An optional higher-speed paper tape reader and punch was available as a separate peripheral.

 The computer contained 113 electronic tubes and 1450 diodes. The tubes were mounted on 34 etched circuit pluggable cards which also contain associated components.  The 34 cards were of only 12 different types.  Card-extenders were available to permit dynamic testing of all machine functions.  680 of the 1450 diodes were mounted on one pluggable logic board.

The LGP-30 required 1500 watts operating under full load.  The power inlet cord could plug into any standard 115 volt 60-cycle single-phase line.  The computer incorporated voltage regulation suitable for powerline variation of 95 to 130 volts. In addition to power regulation, the computer also contained circuitry for a warm-up stage, which minimized thermal shock to the tubes to ensure longer life. The computer contained a cooling fan which directed filtered air through ducts to the tubes and diodes, to extend component life and ensure proper operation.  No expensive air conditioning was necessary if the LGP-30 was operated at reasonable temperatures.

There were 32 bit locations per drum word, but only 31 were used, permitting a "restoration of magnetic flux in the head" at the 32nd bit time. Since there was only one address per instruction, a method was needed to optimize allocation of operands.  Otherwise, each instruction would wait a complete drum (or disk) revolution each time a data reference was made.  The LGP-30 provided for operand-location optimization by interleaving the logical addresses on the drum so that two adjacent addresses (e.g., 00 and 01) were separated by nine physical locations. These spaces allowed for operands to be located next to the instructions which use them.  There were 64 tracks, each with 64 words (sectors).  The time between two adjacent physical words was about 0.260 millisecond (ms), and the time between two adjacent addresses was 9 x 0.260 or 2.340 ms.  The worst-case access time was 16.66 ms.

Half of the instruction (15 bits) was unused.  The unused half could have been used for extra instructions, indexing, indirect addressing, or a second (+1) address to locate the next instruction, each of which would have increased program performance. None of these features were implemented in the LGP-30, but some were realized in its 1960 successor, the RPC-4000.

A unique feature of the LGP-30 was its built-in multiplication, despite being inexpensive. Since this was a drum computer, bits were processed serially as they were read from the drum. As it did each of the additions associated with the multiplication, it effectively shifted the operand right, acting as if the binary point were on the left side of the word, as opposed to the right side as on most other computers.  The divide operation worked similarly.  

To further reduce costs, the traditional front panel lights showing internal registers were absent. Instead, Librascope mounted a small oscilloscope on the front panel that displayed the output from the three register read heads, one above the other, allowing the operator to see and read the bits.  Horizontal and vertical size controls let the operator adjust the display to match a plastic overlay engraved with the bit numbers.
To read bits the operator counted the up- and down-transitions of the oscilloscope trace.

Unlike other computers of its day, internal data was represented in hexadecimal instead of octal, but being a very inexpensive machine it used the physical typewriter keys that correspond to positions 10 to 15 in the type basket for the six non-decimal characters (as opposed to the now normal A – F) to represent those values, resulting in 0 – 9 f g j k q w, which was remembered using the phrase "FiberGlass Javelins Kill Quite Well".

Specifications

Word length: 31 bits, including a sign bit, but no blank spacer bit
Memory size: 4096 words
Speed:  0.260 milliseconds access time between two adjacent physical words; access times between two adjacent addresses 2.340 milliseconds.
Clock rate: 120 kHz
Power consumption: 1500 Watts
Heat dissipation:  
Arithmetic element: three working registers: C the counter register, R the instruction register and A the accumulator register.
Instruction format:  Sixteen instructions using half-word format
Technology: 113 vacuum tubes and 1350 diodes.
Number produced; 320~493
First delivery: September 1956
Price: $47,000
Successor: LGP-21
Achievements: The LGP-30 was one of the first desk-sized computers offering small scale scientific computing. The LGP-30 was fairly popular with "half a thousand" units sold, including one to Dartmouth College where students implemented Dartmouth ALGOL 30 and DOPE (Dartmouth Oversimplified Programming Experiment) on the machine.

ACT-III programming language

The LGP-30 had a high-level language called ACT-III. Every token had to be delimited by an apostrophe, making it hard to read and even harder to prepare tapes:

<nowiki>
s1'dim'a'500'm'500'q'500''
index'j'j+1'j-1''
daprt'e'n't'e'r' 'd'a't'a''cr''
rdxit's35''
s2'iread'm'1''iread'q'1''iread'd''iread'n''
1';'j''
0'flo'd';'d.''
s3'sqrt'd.';'sqrd.''
1'unflo'sqrd.'i/'10';'sqrd''
2010'print'sqrd.''2000'iprt'sqrd''cr''cr''
...
</nowiki>

ALGOL 30
Dartmouth College developed two implementations of ALGOL 60 for the LGP-30.  Dartmouth ALGOL 30 was a three-pass system (compiler, loader, and interpreter) that provided almost all features of ALGOL except those requiring run-time storage allocation.  SCALP, a Self Contained Algol Processor, was a one-pass system for a small subset of ALGOL (no blocks other than the entire program), no procedure declarations, conditional statements but no conditional expressions, no constructs other than while in a for statement, no nested switch declarations (nested calls are permitted), and no boolean variables and operators.  As in ACT-III, every token had to be separated by an apostrophe.

Starting the machine
The procedure for starting, or "booting" the LGP-30 was one of the most complicated ever devised. First, the bootstrap paper tape was snapped into the console typewriter, a Friden Flexowriter. The operator pressed a lever on the Flexowriter to read an address field and pressed a button on the front panel to transfer the address into a computer register. Then the lever on the Flexowriter was pressed to read the data field and three more buttons were pressed on the front panel to store it at the specified address. This process was repeated, maybe six to eight times, and a rhythm was developed:

 burrrp, clunk, 
 burrrp, clunk, clunk, clunk, 
 burrrp, clunk, 
 burrrp, clunk, clunk, clunk,
 burrrp, clunk, 
 burrrp, clunk, clunk, clunk, 
 burrrp, clunk, 
 burrrp, clunk, clunk, clunk, 
 burrrp, clunk, 
 burrrp, clunk, clunk, clunk, 
 burrrp, clunk, 
 burrrp, clunk, clunk, clunk.

The operator then removed the bootstrap tape, snapped in the tape containing the regular loader, carefully arranging it so it would not jam, and pressed a few more buttons to start up the bootstrap program. Once the regular loader was in, the computer was ready to read in a program tape. The regular loader read a more compact format tape than the bootstrap loader. Each block began with a starting address so the tape could be rewound and retried if an error occurred. If any mistakes were made in the process, or if the program crashed and damaged the loader program, the process had to be restarted from the beginning.

LGP-21
In 1963, Librascope produced a transistorized update to the LGP-30 named the LGP-21.  The new computer had about 460 transistors and about 375 diodes.  It cost only $16,250, one-third the price of its predecessor.  Unfortunately it was also about one-third as fast as the earlier computer.

RPC 4000
Another, more-powerful successor machine, was the General Precision RPC 4000, announced in 1960. Similar to the LGP-30, but transistorized, it featured 8,008 32-bit words of memory drum storage.

Notable uses
Edward Lorenz used the LGP-30 in his attempt to model changing weather patterns. His discovery that massive differences in forecast could derive from tiny differences in initial data led to him coining the terms strange attractor and butterfly effect, core concepts in chaos theory. The RPC-4000 (successor to the LGP-30) is also remembered as the computer on which Mel Kaye performed a legendary programming task in machine code, retold by Ed Nather in the hacker epic The Story of Mel.

See also
 IBM 650
 List of vacuum tube computers

Further reading

References

External links
 Working LGP-30 on display in Stuttgart, Germany
 LGP-30 description
 LGP-21 description
 1962 advertisement showing both the LGP-30 and RPC-4000
 Story of Stan P. Frankel, designer of the LGP-30, with photos.
 Programming manual
 Warming up the LGP-30 on YouTube
 technikum 29: LGP 30
 1950-1959 Librazettes – company newsletters on LGP-30:

Vacuum tube computers
Serial computers